The Ostroróg family were notable members of the Polish nobility (szlachta) taking their name from Ostroróg, a town in Szamotuły County, Greater Poland Voivodeship, Poland. They used the Nałęcz coat of arms. Members of the family often held important civic posts in the Wielkpolska region in the Kingdom of Poland, particularly that of voivode. At the end of the 19th-century, family members settled in France, England and for a time, in Turkey.

Coat of arms

Notable members
 Sędziwój Ostroróg (1375–1441), voivode of Poznań Voivodeship
 Dobrogost Ostroróg (1400-1478/79), castellan of Gniezno
 Stanisław Ostroróg (1400–1477), voivode of Kalisz Voivodeship
 Jan Ostroróg (1436–1501), voivode of Poznań Voivodeship, political thinker
 Wacław Ostroróg (?-1527), castellan of Kalisz
 Jakub Ostroróg (1516-1568), magnate and politician from Poznań
 Jan Ostroróg (1561–1622), voivode of Poznań Voivodeship
 Mikołaj Ostroróg (1593–1651), marshal of the Sejm
 Stanisław Julian Ostroróg (1834–1890), Crimean War veteran, photographer under pseudonym, Walery
 Stanisław Julian Ignacy Ostroróg (1863-1929), Art photographer, under pseudonym Walery and combinations thereof
 Leon Walerian Ostroróg (1867-1932), jurist, writer translator. Specialist in Turkish law
 Stanislas Ostroróg (1897-1960), French ambassador to India, grandson of Crimean veteran, Stanisŀaw

References
  Ostrorogowie, PWN Encyklopedia